The 1988 Australian Grand Prix was a Formula One motor race held at the Adelaide Street Circuit on 13 November 1988. It was the sixteenth and final race of the 1988 Formula One World Championship, and the last race for which turbocharged engines would be eligible until the 2014 Australian Grand Prix.

The 82-lap race was won by Frenchman Alain Prost, driving a McLaren-Honda. It was Prost's seventh victory of the season, and the McLaren team's fifteenth, a record for a constructor in a single season that would stand until 2014. Prost's Brazilian teammate and new World Champion Ayrton Senna finished second, having started from pole position, while Senna's compatriot and outgoing champion Nelson Piquet came third in a Lotus-Honda, achieving what would turn out to be the final podium finish for the original Team Lotus.

Qualifying
As had become normal in 1988, qualifying was the domain of the McLaren-Hondas. Senna and Prost easily led the time sheets on both Friday and Saturday, with Prost initially fastest on Friday with a 1:18.179 lap, 0.153 ahead of his teammate. The pair traded pole laps in the second qualifying session, with Senna doing his usual act of snatching pole on the last lap of qualifying with a 1:17.748 lap, only 0.132 in front of his teammate, but 1.7 seconds faster than the next fastest car, Nigel Mansell in the Williams-Judd. During qualifying Senna was hampered by a sprained left wrist having injured it during a game of beach soccer in Bali where he had taken a small holiday after winning the championship in Japan. His injury was such that there was speculation the teams test driver Emanuele Pirro would drive in his place, but the new World Champion refused to be sidelined and took his place in Adelaide, though he admitted that driving the MP4/4 on a tight, bumpy street circuit while nursing a sprained wrist was hard. Prost on the other hand had spent his time between Suzuka and Adelaide playing golf at a resort in the Australian state of Queensland. There was also speculation that Honda would run their V10 engines (intended for ) in Adelaide instead of the V6 turbo. However, team boss Ron Dennis explained that racing the V10 was never part of the 1988 plan, and that with the RA168-E proving so dominant, Honda wanted to finish the turbo era on the highest possible note.

Third on the grid on both days was Nigel Mansell in his atmospheric Williams-Judd, though he was 1.7 seconds slower than Senna. Mansell was ahead of 1987 pole winner Gerhard Berger in his turbocharged Ferrari. Fifth was Nelson Piquet, finally finding some balance in his Lotus on the only street circuit he liked, despite a couple of spins in qualifying. Mansell's teammate Riccardo Patrese lined up sixth.

Gabriele Tarquini (Coloni), Julian Bailey (Tyrrell), Pierre-Henri Raphanel (Larrousse-Lola making his first appearance in F1 in place of Yannick Dalmas who had contracted Legionaire's Disease) and Bernd Schneider (Zakspeed) all failed to qualify.

In Adelaide the drop in power meant a big difference to the top speeds on the 900-metre-long Brabham Straight and times were slower as a result. Senna's 1988 pole time was 0.481 slower than Berger's time in 1987 while Berger himself, driving an updated version of his 1987 Ferrari, was 2.25 seconds slower than his 1987 pole time of 1:17.267.

Race
Prost led off the start from Senna, Berger, Piquet, and Mansell in his last race for Williams before joining Ferrari in 1989. By lap 4, Prost's lead over Senna was 5.5 seconds, with Berger close behind the Brazilian. Michele Alboreto's last race for Ferrari ended in retirement shortly after the start, when he collided with Alex Caffi's Dallara.

Berger passed Senna on lap 5 at the Racetrack Hairpin, a tight second-gear right hander at the end of the Brabham Straight, and began a determined drive, catching and passing Prost at the same place on lap 14. He had a three-second lead when he came up to lap Stefano Modena in the EuroBrun and René Arnoux in the Ligier on lap 23. Arnoux appeared to ignore his mirrors and the blue flags instructing him to let Berger past, causing the Ferrari's left front wheel to ride the Ligier's rear right wheel and send both cars into a spin. Berger retired immediately with suspension damage, putting Prost back into the lead with Senna second.

Behind the McLarens, Piquet was maintaining third ahead of the Williams pair of Patrese and Mansell. The Italian opened a small gap on his teammate and closed on Piquet, making several attempts to pass the Brazilian. However, he spun on lap 53, letting Mansell past. The Englishman was no more successful in trying to pass Piquet, and he retired on lap 66 when his brakes failed and he spun into the wall. By lap 59 Prost was putting in a succession of fast laps, extending his lead to over 30 seconds and lapping the whole field up to the fifth-placed Rial of Andrea de Cesaris.

On lap 46, Pierluigi Martini spun his Minardi at the chicane and was almost collected by Stefan Johansson's Ligier. Maurício Gugelmin slowed his March to avoid the pair, only to be hit from behind by Satoru Nakajima's Lotus, putting both cars out. This crash also had an effect on Prost who was the first car upon the scene. The McLaren ran over some debris which broke off part of the front wing end plate, causing the car to understeer for the rest of the race, though Prost was able to play with his car's onboard settings to compensate and would set the fastest race lap later in the race.

Alessandro Nannini spun his Benetton; Jonathan Palmer's Tyrrell suffered transmission problems; and Arrows drivers Derek Warwick and Eddie Cheever both suffered engine failures. Driveshaft trouble accounted for the EuroBruns of Modena and Oscar Larrauri, while Caffi succumbed to clutch failure in his Dallara.

At the finish, only eleven cars were classified, of which just seven saw the chequered flag: de Cesaris, Johansson and Philippe Alliot's Larrousse-Lola all ran out of fuel in the closing laps, while Philippe Streiff's AGS suffered an electrical failure. Prost led home Senna in yet another McLaren 1–2, with Piquet third and Patrese fourth. De Cesaris' misfortune handed fifth place to Thierry Boutsen in the Benetton despite a spin and a stuttering engine, with Ivan Capelli taking the final point for sixth in his March despite a puncture.

In the last race in which cars with turbocharged engines were allowed to compete until , all three podium positions were taken by cars powered by Honda turbos.

Classification

Pre-qualifying

Qualifying

Race

Championship standings after the race
Bold text indicates World Champions.

Drivers' Championship standings

Constructors' Championship standings

References

Grand Prix
Australian Grand Prix
Australian Grand Prix
Motorsport in Adelaide
Australian Grand Prix